The Vogt Lo-170 is a West German high-wing, FAI Open Class single seat glider that was designed by Alfred Vogt.

Design and development
The development of the Lo-170 was started in 1960. It was intended as a modern  wingspan cross country sailplane for production by Schempp-Hirth.

The forward fuselage was built from welded steel tube, surrounded by a fibreglass skin. The wing was built from plywood in a negative mold and then covered with fibreglass. The wing uses a Wortmann FX 61-184 airfoil.

Schempp-Hirth decided to produce the Schempp-Hirth Standard Austria and its FAI Open Class variant Schempp-Hirth SHK instead and as a result only one Lo-170 was produced.

Operational history
The aircraft was converted to a motor glider in 1972, with two wing-mounted engines.

Specifications (Lo-170)

See also

References

External links
Lo-170 photos

1960s German sailplanes
Glider aircraft
Aircraft first flown in 1968